{{DISPLAYTITLE:C25H50O2}}
The molecular formula C25H50O2 (molar mass: 382.663 g/mol, exact mass: 382.3811 u) may refer to:

 Pentacosylic acid, or hyenic acid
 Stearyl heptanoate

Molecular formulas